Southwest Transitway may refer to:
 Southwest Transitway (Ottawa)
 Southwest Transitway (Winnipeg)

For Southwest LRT, see Southwest Corridor (Minnesota).